Landscape with Wheelbarrow is a watercolor created in 1883 by Vincent van Gogh.

See also
Early works of Vincent van Gogh

References 

 

Paintings by Vincent van Gogh
1883 paintings
Paintings in the collection of the Cleveland Museum of Art